Braja Kishore Prasad Sinha (1909-1996) was an Indian politician. He was a Member of Parliament, representing Bihar in the Rajya Sabha, the upper house of India's Parliament. He was also a member of the Constituent Assembly of India.

References

Rajya Sabha members from Bihar
Indian National Congress politicians
Members of the Constituent Assembly of India
1909 births
1996 deaths
Indian National Congress politicians from Bihar